Rheingau is one of 13 designated German wine regions (Weinbaugebiete) producing quality wines (QbA and Prädikatswein). It was named after the traditional region of Rheingau (meaning "Rhine district"), the wine region is situated in the state of Hesse, where it constitutes part of the Rheingau-Taunus-Kreis administrative district. Although, making up only 3 percent of the total German vineyard area, Rheingau has been the source of many historically important innovations in German wine making, and contains many wine producers of international reputation, such as Schloss Johannisberg.

Geography and terroir

The geography of the Rheingau is very distinct. Around Wiesbaden, the river Rhine detours from its northward flow west for about 30 km before it flows north again. The greater part of the Rheingau is situated here on the river's right bank, but the region also includes the stretch along Rhine after it turns northward again, around the villages Assmannshausen and Lorch. The vineyards in Hochheim on the Main river are also included, just before it flows into Rhine. The Rheingau spans  about 50 km from end to end. North of the Rheingau rises the Taunus mountain range, so most of the Rheingau's vineyards are on south-facing slope between hills and streams, which provides excellent wine-growing conditions in these northerly latitudes.

History

Since the Verona donation in 983, the Rheingau belonged to the archbishopric of Mainz. Legend has it that Charlemagne let the first vineyards be planted in the region, close to present-day Schloss Johannisberg. However finds like a Roman origin grapevine cutting knife point to even earlier cultivation. Better documented is the early influence of the church on Rheingau winemaking, which was controlled from Eberbach Abbey. Augustinians and Benedictines are known to have inhabited the area of the later abbey from 1116, and in 1135 the Cistercians arrived, sent out from Clairvaux. Legend has it that the Cistercians, which are also credited with having founded the wine industry in Burgundy, brought Pinot noir with them to Rheingau, although the earliest record of the grape variety in Rheingau is from 1470. The slopes down from the Taunus mountains belonging to Eberbach Abbey were planted as vineyards in the 12th century, and early in the 13th century the vineyards had reached their present area. In medieval times, more red than white wine was produced, usually as Gemischter Satz, i.e. the vineyards were planted with mixed varieties which were vinified together.

In 2011 it was unveiled, that the Official Wine Classification in the Rheingau has a 150 years history. The classification was the basis for taxation of wineries after the annexation of the Duchy of Nassau by the Kingdom of Prussia in 1866. In the book Der nassauische Weinbau published in 1867 by Friedrich Wilhelm Dünkelberg a historical map Weinbau-Karte des nassauischen Rheingaus (Viticultural map of the Rheingau in the Duchy of Nassau), all known vineyards at that time had been marked up by colour, evaluated and classified in first class vineyards (I. Klasse), second class vineyards (II. Klasse) and the remaining vineyards .

As first class vineyards (I. Klasse) only 13 Lagen in 9 boundaries had been classified:

Villages and producers

Some villages of Rheingau, listed in the downstream direction of Rhine, with some notable vineyards and producers.

Hochheim am Main
vineyards Domdechaney, Kirchenstück and 
Weingut Künstler
Weingut W. J. Schäfer
Walluf
J.B. Becker, a family owned wine-producer since 1893
Eltville
Hessische Staatsweingüter Kloster Eberbach ("Hessian State Wineries Eberbach Abbey"), moved to a new cellar next to the vineyard Steinberg, Kloster Eberbach
Rauenthal
vineyards Baiken and Nonnenberg
Kiedrich
vineyard 
Weingut Robert Weil
Hattenheim
vineyards Mannberg and Wisselbrunnen
vineyard Steinberg, next to Eberbach Abbey, does not use a village name in its vineyard designation
Hessische Staatsweingüter Kloster Eberbach has its main cellars in a newly constructed facility close to the Steinberg vineyard, after having previously been located in Eltville
vineyard , is shared with the neighbouring village of Erbach
Oestrich
vineyards Doosberg and Lenchen
Weingut Josef Spreitzer
Weingut Peter Jakob Kühn
Winkel
vineyards Hasensprung and Jesuitengarten
Schloss Vollrads, both a producer and a vineyard name, does not use a village name in its vineyard designation
Johannisberg
Schloss Johannisberg, both a producer and a vineyard name, does not use a village name in its vineyard designation
Rüdesheim
vineyards , primarily Berg Roseneck, Berg Rottland and Berg Schlossberg
Weingut Georg Breuer
 Weingut Carl Jung
Weingut Josef Leitz 
 Weingut Dr. Heinrich Nägler
Assmannshausen
vineyard Höllenberg, famous for its red wines
Weingut August Kesseler

Maps

Grape varieties

The most cultivated grape varieties, by area in 2019, were:

References

External links
 Rheingau Wine Production Detail

Wine regions of Germany
Geography of Hesse
Rheingau